Sneer was an American experimental music and award-winning filmmaking duo formed by Sarah Rivka and Tomas Seidita in Los Angeles, California.

Discography
Singles
"No Recent Activity" (2012)
"After Dark" (2013)

Awards
Jury Award Best Experimental Film — NFFTY 2013
First Place Experimental — Josiah Media Festival 2013

References

American experimental musical groups
American musical duos
Musical groups established in 2012
American video artists
2012 establishments in California